Rhos Cefn Hir (or Rhoscefnhir) is a village in the  community of Pentraeth, Anglesey, Wales, which is 130.8 miles (210.5 km) from Cardiff and 210.8 miles (339.2 km) from London.

References

See also
List of localities in Wales by population

Villages in Anglesey
Pentraeth